Sidhi Lok Sabha constituency is one of the 29 Lok Sabha constituencies in Madhya Pradesh state in central India. This constituency covers the entire Sidhi and Singrauli districts and part of Shahdol district.

Assembly segments
Presently, after the delimitation of legislative assembly constituencies, Sidhi Lok Sabha constituency comprises the following eight Vidhan Sabha (Legislative Assembly) segments:

Members of Parliament

Election results

General Elections 2019

General Elections 2014

General Elections 2009

Notes

References
Election Commission of India -http://www.eci.gov.in/StatisticalReports/ElectionStatistics.asp

See also
 Sidhi district
 List of Constituencies of the Lok Sabha

Lok Sabha constituencies in Madhya Pradesh
Sidhi district
Singrauli district